VC Dynamo Krasnodar, or VC Dinamo Krasnodar, is a Russian professional men's volleyball teams, based in Krasnodar, playing in Super League since 2010.

Team roster

2016/2017
Head coach:  Andrei Voronkov

Notable players
Notable, former or current players of club, who are medalist of intercontinental tournaments in national teams or clubs.

External links
Official site

Russian volleyball clubs
Sports clubs in Krasnodar